Curtis James Bird (baptized 1 February 1838 – 13 June 1876) was a Canadian doctor, politician, and Speaker of the Manitoba Legislative Assembly from 1873 to 1874.

Bird graduated from St John's College in Winnipeg) and later studied medicine at Guy's Hospital in London before returning to Canada to practice medicine and later as coroner.

Bird, Henry Septimus Beddome, John Christian Schultz and others were the founders of the Medical Health Board of Manitoba which was incorporated in 1871 and became the College of Physicians and Surgeons of Manitoba in 1877.

He was the youngest son of James Bird, a long time HBC employee who ended his career at the Red River Settlement. An older half brother, James Bird (Jimmy Jock) had a long career as a free trader and sometimes HBC employee.

References

 
 Manitoba Historical Society - Memorable Manitobans: Curtis James Bird

1838 births
1876 deaths
Speakers of the Legislative Assembly of Manitoba
Members of the Legislative Assembly of Assiniboia
Members of the Council of Assiniboia